was a gag manga series by Verno Mikawa. It was serialized in Ichijinsha's Josei manga magazine Monthly Comic Zero Sum since the magazine's first issue in March 2002 and has been collected in twenty tankōbon volumes as of February 2019. An anime television series adaptation by Seven began airing from January 9, 2014. A second season was announced for July.

Characters

Media

Anime
An anime television series adaptation by Seven began airing from January 9, 2014. The series was simulcasted by Crunchyroll with English subtitles in North America and other select parts of the world. A sequel series was also simulcast on Crunchyroll in July.

References

External links
  
 

Anime series based on manga
Comedy anime and manga
Ichijinsha manga
Josei manga
Seven (animation studio)